Viktor Sergeyevich Tolstykh (born 17 May 1985) is a Russian former professional football player.

Club career
He played 6 seasons in the Russian Football National League for FC Dynamo Bryansk.

External links
 
 

1985 births
Living people
Russian footballers
Association football defenders
FC Dynamo Bryansk players
FC Spartak Tambov players
FC Neftekhimik Nizhnekamsk players
FC Chernomorets Novorossiysk players